Josiah Magnuson (born August 17, 1991) is a member of the South Carolina House of Representatives from the 38th district, serving since 2016. He is a member of the Republican Party.

In 2019, during debate on a heartbeat bill, Nancy Mace, one of Magnuson's Republican colleagues in the South Carolina House, argued in favor of adding a rape and incest exception to the bill, and related her own experience of having been raped at age 16. Magnuson later distributed a series of postcards to each desk in the House that stated in part, “It is a twisted logic that would kill the unborn child for the misdeed of the parent.”

In 2021 Magnuson was elected as the Secretary of the South Carolina Freedom Caucus.  He also serves as 2nd Vice Chair of the House Agriculture, Natural Resources & Environmental Affairs Committee, and is a member of the House Legislative Oversight Committee.

In 2023, Magnuson was one of 21 Republican co-sponsors of the South Carolina Prenatal Equal Protection Act of 2023, which would make women who had abortions eligible for the death penalty.

References

1991 births
Living people
Republican Party members of the South Carolina House of Representatives
Politicians from Greenville, South Carolina
21st-century American politicians